The 2022 South Dakota House of Representatives elections were held on November 8, 2022, as part of the biennial 2022 United States elections. All 70 seats in the South Dakota House of Representatives were up for election. Primary elections were held on June 7, 2022. The elections coincided with elections for other offices in South Dakota, including the US Senate, US House, South Dakota Governor, South Dakota Secretary of State, South Dakota Attorney General, and the South Dakota Senate.
 
Following the 2022 elections, Republicans expanded their supermajority by one seat, giving them a 63-to-7 member advantage over Democrats.

Retirements

Democrats
District 1: Jennifer Healy Keintz retired to run for Lieutenant Governor of South Dakota.
District 15: Jamie Smith retired to run for Governor of South Dakota.
District 26A: Shawn Bordeaux retired due to term limits.

Republicans
District 2: Lana Greenfield retired due to term limits.
District 3: Drew Dennert retired.
District 5: Nancy York retired.
District 7: Tim Reed retired to run for state senate from District 7.
District 7: Larry Tidemann retired.
District 8: Marli Wiese retired.
District 9: Rhonda Milstead retired.
District 10: Doug Barthel retired.
District 10: Steve Haugaard retired due to term limits.
District 11: Mark Willadsen retired due to term limits.
District 12: Arch Beal retired due to term limits.
District 16: David Anderson retired due to term limits.
District 17: Sydney Davis retired to run for state senate from District 17.
District 19: Kent Peterson retired due to term limits.
District 20: Paul Miskimins retired.
District 23: Spencer Gosch retired to run for state senate from District 23.
District 23: Charles Hoffman retired.
District 25: Tom Pischke retired to run for state senate from District 25.
District 28B: J. Sam Marty retired due to term limits.
District 29: Dean Wink retired to run for state senate from District 29.
District 30: Tim Goodwin retired to run for state senate from District 30.
District 32: Chris P. Johnson retired.
District 33: Taffy Howard retired to run for U. S. Representative from South Dakota's at-large congressional district.

Predictions

Defeated Incumbents

Primary Election
District 3: Republican Kaleb Weis lost renomination to Brandei Schaefbauer.
District 13: Republican Richard Thomason lost renomination to Tony Vanhuizen.
District 16: Republican Richard Vasgaard lost renomination to Karla Lems.
District 19: Republican Caleb Finck lost renomination to Jessica Bahmuller and Drew Peterson.

General Election
District 18: Democrat Ryan Cwach was defeated in the general election by Republican Julie Auch.

Summary of Results by State House District

Primary Election Results Source:

General Election Results Source:

Detailed Results

Primary Election Results Source:

General Election Results Source:
Note: If a primary election is not listed, then there was not a competitive primary in that district (i.e., every candidate who ran in the primary advanced to the general election).

District 1
General election

District 2
Republican primary

General election

District 3
Republican primary

General election

District 4
Republican primary

General election

District 5
General election

District 6
General election

District 7
Republican primary

General election

District 8
Republican primary

General election

District 9
Republican primary

General election

District 10
General election

District 11
Republican primary

Democratic primary

General election

District 12
Republican primary

General election

District 13
Republican primary

General election

District 14
Republican primary

General election

District 15
General election

District 16
Republican primary

General election

District 17
General election

District 18
General election

District 19
Republican primary

General election

District 20
Republican primary

General election

District 21
General election

District 22
General election

District 23
Republican primary

General election

District 24
Republican primary

General election

District 25
General election

District 26A
Republican primary

Democratic primary

General election

District 26B
General election

District 27
General election

District 28A
General election

District 28B
Republican primary

General election

District 29
Republican primary

General election

District 30
Republican primary

General election

District 31
Republican primary

General election

District 32
Republican primary

General election

District 33
Republican primary

General election

District 34
Republican primary

General election

District 35
Republican primary

General election

References 

South Dakota House of Representatives elections
South Dakota House of Representatives
House of Representatives